The 1982 BYU Cougars football team represented the Brigham Young University (BYU) in the 1982 NCAA Division I-A football season as a member of the Western Athletic Conference (WAC). The team was led by head coach LaVell Edwards, in his eleventh year, and played their home games at Cougar Stadium in Provo, Utah. They finished the season with a record of eight wins and four losses (8–4, 7–1 WAC), as WAC Champions and with a loss against Ohio State in the Holiday Bowl.

Schedule

Reference:

Game summaries

Utah

Source:

Roster

Awards and honors
Neil Balholm: Second-team All-WAC
Chuck Ehin: First-team All-WAC
Lloyd Eldredge: First-team All-WAC
Tom Holmoe: First-team All-WAC
Gordon Hudson: Consensus All-American, first-team All-WAC
Mike Mees: First-team All-WAC
Mike Morgan: First-team All-WAC
Bart Oates: First-team All-WAC
Todd Shell: First-team All-WAC
Vince Stroth: First-team All-WAC
Casey Tiumalu: Second-team All-WAC
Steve Young: First-team All-WAC

References

BYU
BYU Cougars football seasons
Western Athletic Conference football champion seasons
BYU Cougars football